Sanka is a brand of instant decaffeinated coffee

It may also refer to:
 Sanka, Lesser Poland Voivodeship, a village in the administrative district of Gmina Krzeszowice, within Kraków County, Lesser Poland Voivodeship, in southern Poland
 Sanka, Hooghly, a village in West Bengal, India
 Sanka (film), a 1972 Japanese film by Kaneto Shindō
 Sanka, a fictional military aircraft model in the Sky Crawlers book series